Scopula pyrrhochra is a moth of the  family Geometridae. It is found in Kenya.

References

Moths described in 1916
pyrrhochra
Moths of Africa